Erich Zenger (July 5, 1939, Dollnstein – April 4, 2010, Münster) was a German Roman Catholic priest and theologian. Ordained in 1964, Zenger studied in Rome, Italy.

From 1973 to 2004, he served as a professor of Old Testament studies at the University of Münster/Westfalen, and he wrote books and papers on the Old Testament.

Notes 

1939 births
2010 deaths
20th-century German Roman Catholic priests
20th-century German Catholic theologians
German biblical scholars
Old Testament scholars
Academic staff of the University of Münster
German male non-fiction writers
People from Eichstätt (district)